Ron Chambers (born 5 October 1958) is a retired Jamaican long jumper.

He won the bronze medal at the 1978 Central American and Caribbean Games, the silver medal at the 1991 Central American and Caribbean Championships, finished fifth at the 1991 Pan American Games and 11th at the 1994 Commonwealth Games.

He became Jamaican champion in 1991 and 1994, and also triple jump champion in 1992. His personal best jump was 8.18 metres, achieved in April 1990 in Miami.

References

1958 births
Living people
Jamaican male long jumpers
Competitors at the 1978 Central American and Caribbean Games
Central American and Caribbean Games bronze medalists for Jamaica
Central American and Caribbean Games medalists in athletics
Athletes (track and field) at the 1991 Pan American Games
Pan American Games competitors for Jamaica
Athletes (track and field) at the 1994 Commonwealth Games
20th-century Jamaican people
21st-century Jamaican people